Kurt Edler (10 April 1950 – December 2021) was a German politician. A member of the Green Alternative List, he served in the Hamburg Parliament from 1985 to 1986 and again from 1993 to 1997. He died in December 2021, at the age of 71.

References

1950 births
2021 deaths
20th-century German politicians
Alliance 90/The Greens politicians
Members of the Hamburg Parliament
People from Oldenburg (city)